Lovell may refer to:

Places

United States
 Lovell, Maine, a town
 Lovell, Ohio, an unincorporated community
 Lovell, Oklahoma, a census-designated place
 Lovell, Wyoming, a town
 Chattanooga Metropolitan Airport (Lovell Field), Chattanooga, Tennessee

Elsewhere
 Minster Lovell, Oxfordshire, UK
 Lovell (crater), a small crater on the far side of the moon

Other uses 
 Lovell (surname)
 Lovell Cook (born 1990), American professional basketball player
 Lovell Pinkney (born 1972), American football player
 Lovell Rousseau (1818 – 1869), a Union Army general during the American Civil War
 Lovell Telescope at Jodrell Bank, UK

See also 
 Lowell (disambiguation)
 Lovells (disambiguation)